The Manitoba Hockey Association (MHA) was an early men's senior ice hockey league playing around 1900 in Manitoba, Canada.  The league started as an elite amateur league in 1892, became professional in 1905, had a professional and an amateur league in 1908–09 and only an amateur league from 1909 until 1923.  Two teams from the league won the Stanley Cup, the Winnipeg Victorias and the Kenora Thistles.  Three other teams from the league challenged for the Stanley Cup: Brandon Wheat City, Winnipeg Maple Leafs, and the Winnipeg Rowing Club. Other teams in the league won the Allan Cup: Winnipeg Hockey Club, Winnipeg Falcons, Winnipeg Monarchs and Winnipeg Victorias.

It also was known as the Manitoba Hockey League and Manitoba Professional Hockey League in following years.

History

Founding
The Manitoba Hockey Association was formed on November 11, 1892 to organize ice hockey play in Manitoba.

Manitoba & Northwestern Hockey Association
In 1904, it would absorb the Manitoba & Northwestern Hockey Association league, and include the Rat Portage/Kenora Thistles team from the province of Ontario. Kenora, ON was originally named Rat Portage.

Manitoba Professional Hockey League (MPHL)
In 1905, the league started to have professional players, and renamed itself the Manitoba Professional Hockey League (MPHL). This lasted until the end of the 1908–09 season, when several teams folded. E. A. Gilroy served on the league executive and coached the Portage la Prairie team. Teams in the league also competed for the Fit-Reform Cup, the Western Canada championship.

Manitoba Hockey League (MHL)
In November 1908, Claude C. Robinson led efforts to establish a senior amateur hockey league in Winnipeg affiliated with the Manitoba Amateur Athletic Association. Robinson coached the Victorias to a Manitoba Hockey League (MHL) championship for the 1908–09 season, and felt that his team could have competed for the newly-established Allan Cup, although challenges from senior ice hockey teams were accepted only from Eastern Canada at the time.

Winnipeg Amateur Hockey League

The Winnipeg Monarchs led by Fred Marples, made arrangements to play and practice at the Winnipeg Amphitheatre for the 1912–13 season. The decision caused a rift within the league which had an agreement from the previous season to play all games at the Winnipeg Auditorium, which was preferred by the Winnipeg Hockey Club and the Winnipeg Victorias. Marples and the Monarchs felt that the league did not have the authority to bind any club to any single rink, and that the Amphitheatre had better amenities for the players and spectators. As a compromise to have an outside person settle the disagreement, W. F. Taylor was elected president of the league; and Marples was elected as the secretary-treasurer. Taylor then cast a tie-breaking vote to uphold a decision by the previous executive to play all league games at the Auditorium.

The Winnipeg Tribune wrote that the leadership of Taylor and Marples had brought peace and financial stability to the Winnipeg Amateur Hockey League, and both were re-elected for the 1913–14 season. The league chose to play its games at both the Amphitheatre and the Auditorium; and appointed a board of on-ice officials to avoid in-season arguing over the selection of officials, as suggested by Marples.

In January 1914, the league debated whether players from leagues from elsewhere in Manitoba and Northwestern Ontario were eligible to be a reserve player. Debate focused on whether these leagues were an equal level of senior hockey, or a lower level of intermediate hockey. The issue was temporarily resolved by asking permission from the other league for the player to be a reserve in another league. The issue resurfaced again in the national playoffs for the Allan Cup. Trustees for the cup struggled to determine player eligibility since there was no authoritative national body to classify leagues by the level of play, and determine who was a senior level player compared to an intermediate level player. The Monarchs won the regular season title and were chosen to defend the first challenge for the 1914 Allan Cup on behalf of the league. When Allan Cup trustee William Northey ruled that Dick Irvin of the Winnipeg Strathconas was ineligible to compete, the Monarchs refused to defend the Allan Cup. Marples considered the Strathconas to be a reserve team for the Monarchs and that the decision was unfair to his team. After three days of negotiating, the Monarchs agreed to play without Irvin in a one-game Allan Cup challenge versus the Kenora Thistles, instead of the customary two-game series decided on total goals scored. The Monarchs won versus the Kenora Thistles, then lost the second Allan Cup challenge in a one-game final to the Regina Victorias.

Allan Cup trustee Claude C. Robinson, suggested that a governing body be formed for hockey in Canada, which was echoed by similar calls from The Winnipeg Tribune and the Winnipeg Free Press. The league met on June 23, 1914, to form a governing body to oversee hockey in Manitoba. Taylor was appointed chairman and Marples was appointed secretary of a provisional commission which later became the Manitoba Amateur Hockey Association (MAHA), and sought to merge into a national commission when such a body became established. The Canadian Amateur Hockey Association (CAHA) was founded on December 4, 1914, with Taylor elected as its first president, and Robinson elected as its first secretary.

For the 1914–15 season, the league adopted all Allan Cup rules and player eligibility. The league also supported formation of the Winnipeg Intermediate Hockey League for the second-tier teams of its clubs, and appointed Robinson chairman of the intermediate league.

The Winnipeg Amateur Hockey League included teams composed of military personnel for the 1915–16 season, and raised funds to support soldiers and the war effort. The league was renamed to the Winnipeg Patriotic Hockey League.

During World War I, the league donated a portion of profits towards patriotic funds to support the war effort. The Monarchs repeated as league champions in the 1914–15 season and defeated the Melville Millionaires to win the 1915 Allan Cup. Robert McKay succeeded Taylor as league president in 1915, as registration of players decreased due to enlistments during the war. The league renamed itself the Patriotic Hockey League as of the 1915–16 season, which saw the Winnipeg 61st Battalion win the 1916 Allan Cup. The Winnipeg Patriotic Hockey League became the Winnipeg Military Hockey League during the 1917–18 season, and its teams were temporarily renamed for battles fought during the war.

Teams

† Stanley Cup winner.

Manitoba Professional Hockey League

‡ Stanley Cup winner.
† Brandon and Kenora only played one game in 1907–08 season before ceasing play.

Manitoba Hockey League

In parallel with the MPHL, the MHA started the MHL amateur senior league in 1908–09. The Winnipeg Falcons, which entered the league in 1915, would win the 1920 championship, then win the Allan Cup national championship. As Allan Cup winners, the Falcons were selected to represent Canada at the 1920 Olympics, where the team would win the first Olympic gold medal for ice hockey.

Notes:
WAHL = Winnipeg Amateur Hockey League, MMHL = Manitoba Military Hockey League

‡ Allan Cup winners.
† Olympic champions.

See also
 List of Stanley Cup champions
 Hockey Manitoba

Notes

References

External links
 Kenora Thistles stats
 puckerings early stats pages

 
Sports leagues established in 1892
1892 establishments in Manitoba
Sports leagues disestablished in 1923
1923 disestablishments in Manitoba